This is a list of artists primarily associated with the disco era of the 1970s and some of their most noteworthy disco hits. Numerous artists, not usually considered disco artists, implemented some of the styles and sounds of disco music, and are also included. This includes artists who have either been very important to the genre or have had a considerable amount of exposure (such as those that have been on a major label). Bands are listed by the first letter in their name (not including the words "a", "an", or "the"), and individuals are listed by last name.

 References 

 
Disco